The Roman Catholic Diocese of Shantou/Swatow is a diocese located in the city of Shantou in the Ecclesiastical province of Guangzhou in China.

History
 April 6, 1914: Established as Apostolic Vicariate of Chaozhou 潮州 from the Apostolic Vicariate of Guangdong 廣東
 August 18, 1915: Renamed as Apostolic Vicariate of Shantou 汕頭
 April 11, 1946: Promoted as Diocese of Shantou 汕頭

Leadership
 Bishops of Shantou 汕頭 (Roman rite)
 Bishop Peter Zhuang Jian-jian (2006–present) (Clandestinely)
 Bishop John Cai Tiyuan (1981–2000)
 Bishop Charles Vogel, M.E.P. (April 11, 1946–April 13, 1958)
 Vicars Apostolic of Shantou 汕頭 (Roman Rite)
 Bishop Charles Vogel, M.E.P. (December 9, 1935–April 11, 1946)
 Bishop Adolphe Rayssac, M.E.P. (July 17, 1914–May 1, 1935)

References 
 GCatholic.org
 Catholic Hierarchy

1914 establishments in China
Christianity in Guangdong
Christian organizations established in 1914
Roman Catholic dioceses and prelatures established in the 20th century
Roman Catholic dioceses in China
Shantou